Mari is a feminine given name in the Breton, Japanese,  Armenian,
Estonian, Georgian, Hungarian, Finnish, Welsh, Swedish and Norwegian languages. It is also a devotional given name in Tamil. It can be seen as a cognate of Mary in Danish, Finnish, Norwegian or Swedish. In the countries of Georgia and Armenia, Mari is a shortened version of the name Mariam. In Armenia, Mari (Մարի) was the 2nd-most-common female given name of 2013. 

真理, "truth"
万里, "long distance"
茉莉, "jasmine"
麻里, "hemp, village"
麻莉, "hemp, white jasmine"
愛莉, "love, white jasmine"(This kanji can also be read as Airi.)
The name can also be written in hiragana or katakana.

People 
Saint Mari, a 1st-century saint of the Church of the East and several other denominations
Mari of Seleucia-Ctesiphon, Patriarch of the Church of the East (987–999)
Mari ibn Suleiman (12th century), historian
Mari Abel (born 1975), Estonian actress
Mari Akasaka (真理, born 1964), Japanese novelist
Mari Alkatiri (born 1949), Prime Minister of East Timor from 2002 to 2006
Mari Amachi (真理, born 1951), Japanese singer and actress
Mari Ellis (1913-2015), Welsh writer and women's rights activist
Mari Hamada (麻里, born 1962), Japanese rock singer
Mari Hamada (actress) (マリ, born 1968), Japanese singer and actress
Mari Hanafusa (まり, born 1974), Japanese actress in Takarazuka Revue
Mari Henmi (マリ, born 1950), Japanese singer and actress
, Japanese volleyball player
Mari Hoshino (真里, born 1981), Japanese actress
Mari Hulman George (1934–2018), American auto racing executive
Mari Iijima (真理, born 1963), Japanese singer-songwriter
Mari Jászai (1850–1926), Hungarian actress 
Mari Kalkun (born 1986), Estonian singer and musician 
Mari Kurismaa (born 1956u), Estonian artist and architect
Mari Kimura (木村 まり, born 1962), Japanese violinist and composer
Mari Kinsigo (1946–2014), Estonian chess Woman FIDE Master
Mari Kiviniemi (born 1968), Finnish politician and former Prime Minister of Finland
Mari Klaup (born 1990), Estonian heptathlete
Mari Kodama (麻里, born 1967), Japanese pianist
Mari Kotani (真理, born 1958), Japanese science fiction critic
Mari Lill (born 1945), Estonian actress
Mari Mahr (born 1941) is a Hungarian-British photographer
Mari Mashiba (摩利, born 1959), Japanese voice actress
Mari Matsuda (born 1956), American lawyer, activist, and law professor
Mari Mori (茉莉, 1903–1987), Japanese author, daughter of novelist Mori Ōgai
Mari Motohashi (麻里, born 1986), Japanese curler
Mari Must (1920–2008), Estonian linguist 
Mari Natsuki (マリ, born 1952), Japanese singer, dancer, and actress
Mari Ness (born c 1971) is an American poet and author
Mari Ozaki (まり, born 1975), Japanese long-distance runner
Mari Ozawa (真理), Japanese manga artist
Mari Possa (born 1980), Salvadoran actress
Mari Saat (born 1947), Estonian writer
, Japanese actress
Mari Shirato (真理, born 1958), Japanese actress
Mari Tarand (1941–2020), Estonian journalist and radio personality
Mari Törőcsik (1935–2021), Hungarian stage and film actress
Mari Wilson (born 1954), English pop and jazz singer
Mari Yaguchi (真里, born 1983), former member of the Japanese idol group Morning Musume
Mari Yonehara (万里, 1950–2006), Japanese translator, essayist, non-fiction writer and novelist

Fictional characters 
 Mari Iyagi, in My Beautiful Girl, Mari
 , in the anime series Yuri!!! on Ice
 , in the manga and anime series Prison School
 Mari Jiwe McCabe, also known as Vixen, a DC Comics character
 , in the Japanese animated film series Rebuild of Evangelion
 , in the anime series Love Live! Sunshine!!
 , in the anime series A Place Further Than The Universe
 , in the manga and anime series Rainbow Days
 , in the light novel series The Irregular at Magic High School
 , in the tokusatsu television series Kamen Rider 555
 , in the tokusatsu television series Kamen Rider Fourze
 , in the manga series Inubaka: Crazy for Dogs
 Maari, in the Tamil action comedy Maari
 MARI, in the psychological horror RPG Omori
 Mari, in the side-scrolling MMORPG Grand Chase

See also
Mari (disambiguation)
Temari (toy), "hand ball" in Japanese
Maari (film)

Japanese feminine given names
Estonian feminine given names
Finnish feminine given names